Baculoviral IAP repeat-containing protein 7 is a protein that in humans is encoded by the BIRC7 gene.

The protein encoded by this gene is a member of the family of inhibitor of apoptosis proteins (IAP) and contains a single copy of a baculovirus IAP repeat (BIR) as well as a RING-type zinc finger domain. The BIR domain is essential for inhibitory activity and interacts with caspases, while the RING finger domain sometimes enhances antiapoptotic activity but does not inhibit apoptosis alone. Two transcript variants encoding different isoforms have been found for this gene. The two isoforms have different antiapoptotic properties, with isoform alpha protecting cells from apoptosis induced by staurosporine and isoform b protecting cells from apoptosis induced by etoposide.
In melanoma, BIRC7 gene expression is regulated by the Microphthalmia-associated transcription factor.

References

External links

Further reading